is a Japanese professional shogi player ranked 9-dan. He is a former holder of the Tenth Dan, Ōi, and Kiō titles.

Takahashi is a member of the so-called Shōwa 55 group (55年組), a group of eight strong players that become professional in 1980–1981 (Year 55 of the Shōwa period) and won numerous shogi tournaments. Others in the group include Yoshikazu Minami, Osamu Nakamura, Akira Shima, Yasuaki Tsukada, Hiroshi Kamiya, Masaki Izumi, and Yūji Yoda.

Early life
Takahashi was born on April 23, 1960, in Tokyo. He learned how to play shogi when he was twelve years old, and entered the Japan Shogi Association's apprentice school when he was fifteen years old at the rank of 6-kyū as a protegee of shogi professional  in 1975.

Takahashi was promoted to the rank of 1-dan in 1977 and then 3-dan in 1979 before obtaining full professional status and the rank of 4-dan in June 1980.

Promotion history
Takahashi's promotion history is as follows:
 6-kyū: 1975
 1-dan: 1977
 4-dan: June 4, 1980
 5-dan: April 1, 1982
 6-dan: April 1, 1984
 7-dan: November 17, 1986
 8-dan: April 1, 1989
 9-dan: April 1, 1990

Titles and other championships
Takahashi has appeared in major title matches a total of ten times and has won five titles. In addition to major titles, he has won three other shogi championships during his career.

Major titles

Note: Tournaments marked with an asterisk (*) are no longer held.

Other championships

Note: Tournaments marked with an asterisk (*) are no longer held.

Awards and honors
Takahashi received the Japan Shogi Association Annual Shogi Awards for "Best New Player" (1983), the "Technique Award" (1985), "Player of the Year" (1986) and "Most Games Played" (1987). He also received the association's "Shogi Honor Award" in 2000 for winning 600 official games, the "25 Years Service Award" in 2005 for being an active professional for twenty-five years, and the "Shogi Honor Fighting-spirit Award" in 2014 for winning 800 official games.

Year-end prize money and game fee ranking
Takahashi has finished in the "Top 10" of the JSA's  four times since 1993. His highest finish came in 1996 when he finished fourth.

Note: All amounts are given in Japanese yen and include prize money and fees earned from official tournaments and games held from January 1 to December 31.

Notes

References

External links
ShogiHub: Professional Player Info · Takahashi, Michio

1960 births
Japanese shogi players
Living people
Professional shogi players
Professional shogi players from Tokyo Metropolis
Tenth Dan
Ōi (shogi)
Kiō